Institute Of Physical Education Udon Thani Stadium is a stadium in Udon Thani Province, Thailand.  It is currently used for football matches and is the home stadium of Udon Thani F.C. in the Thai League 2.  The stadium holds 3,500 spectators.

References

External links
Stadium information at Worldstadiums.com 
The Stadium on Udon Thani FC English on Facebook

Football venues in Thailand
Buildings and structures in Udon Thani province
Udon Thani F.C.